The Nutana Curling Club is a curling club located in the neighbourhood of Nutana Suburban Centre in south-central Saskatoon, Saskatchewan, Canada.

The club was organized in 1929 at the Nutana Collegiate Institute. The club was first opened in 1930 at the corner of Dufferin Avenue and Main Street in the Nutana neighbourhood of the city. In 1966, it moved to its current suburban location at the corner of Arlington Avenue and Taylor Street. 

The club hosts the annual Colonial Square Ladies Classic, one of women's events on the World Curling Tour and former Grand Slam of Curling event. It also hosts the annual Point Optical Curling Classic on the men's World Curling Tour. Additionally, it hosted the 1999 Canadian Senior Curling Championships and the 1993 TSN Skins Game.

Winners
Teams from the Nutana have won the provincial men's championship ten times. The Charles Anderson rink was the first in 1934. Other winning rinks to win were J.S. Black in 1935, Dalton Henderson in 1946, Rick Folk (1978, 1979, 1980), Eugene Hritzuk (1985, 1988), Darrell McKee (2010) and Steve Laycock (2014, 2018). Folk and his rink of Ron Mills, Tom Wilson and Jim Wilson would go on to win the 1980 Labatt Brier and the 1980 Air Canada Silver Broom, the World Curling Championships.

External links
Official site
History

Curling clubs established in 1929
Curling clubs in Canada
Sport in Saskatoon
1929 establishments in Saskatchewan
Curling in Saskatchewan